Sau Mai Kedekede now more commonly referred to as Sau ni Vanua ko Lau is one of the preeminent titles held by the Paramount Chief of the Lau Islands in Fiji.

History
The title Sau Mai Kedekede originates from the Tongan word “Hau”, denoting the divine nature of the Tu'i Tonga suggesting the frequent intercourse amongst the chiefly houses of Lakeba and Tonga in pre-Christian times. The title of Sau is considered much older and is independent of the title Tui Nayau, now held in tandem by the Paramount Chief of the Lau Islands, as its original holders were from the island of Lakeba (pre-Vuanirewa dynasty).

The first recorded holder of the title was Qilaiso and through him and his three descendants and successors, all of the southern Lau Islands(Moce, Kabara, Fulaga, Ono-i- Lau and their dependencies) was brought into Lakeba’s control and suzerainty. The Sau title eventually merged in time with the title Tui Nayau, and its dual usage commenced in the person of Rasolo. Both titles Sau Mai Kedekede and Tui Nayau are now inextricably linked, and heirs succeeding to the title Tui Nayau cannot do so unless recognised and installed as Sau Ni Vanua.

The installation
The investment ceremony for the Sau Ni Vanua takes place in Tubou on Lakeba. Once the elders of the Vuanirewa have endorsed the successor to the previous Tui Nayau, the Ramasi or chief makers and Vakavanua being chief herald are summoned to undertake the ceremony. The Ramasi consists of the Tui Tubou and the Tui Nasaqalau and the vanua represented by the Vakavanua of Ceiekena and Tui Soso (from Nukunuku village). During the ceremony the recipient will have a piece of bark cloth tied on his arms by each of the Ramasi and the coronation turban or salasiga placed upon his head by the Vakavanua. He also receives the coronation cup containing kava from the vakavanua, which he must drink to affirm his becoming Sau Ni Vanua O Lau. This is then followed by a general kava ceremony where principal chiefs of rank in Lau drink in turn, ceremonial titles are conferred by the Sau and gifts are presented by his people. The Sau's installation concludes with the removal of the arm bands and ritual bath after four days.

Title holders
The historical holders of the title of Sau Mai Kedekede:

Of the Ceiekena Dynasty (16–17th century):
Qilaiso
Bativanua
Ginigini
Vuakilau or Fuakilau

Levuka Occupancy of Lakeba (early to mid-18th century)
Codro

The Vuanirewa Dynasty (mid-18th century to present)
(title merges with Tui Nayau title in the person of Rasolo)

Footnotes

References
The Fruit of the Rewa By A.C Reid, Journal of Pacific History-Vol 12:1-2 (1977)
Lau Islands, Fiji By A.M Hocart, Published by the Bishop Museum, Hawaii (1929)
Southern Lau, Fiji: An Ethnography By Laura Thompson, Published by the Bishop Museum, Hawaii (1940)
Tovata I & II By AC Reid, Printed in Fiji by Oceania printers Fiji (1990)

Vuanirewa
Fijian nobility

Tui Nayau